Dorota Chylak (born 14 November 1966) is a Polish breaststroke swimmer. She competed in two events at the 1988 Summer Olympics.

References

External links
 

1966 births
Living people
Polish female breaststroke swimmers
Olympic swimmers of Poland
Swimmers at the 1988 Summer Olympics
Swimmers from Warsaw